Bogata (formerly Bogata de Mureș; ;) is a commune in Mureș County, Transylvania, Romania. It is composed of two villages, Bogata and Ranta (Ránta).

The settlement was first documented in 1295.

See also 
 List of Hungarian exonyms (Mureș County)

References 

Communes in Mureș County
Localities in Transylvania
Székely communities